Giovanni Fonticelli (April 4, 1662 – May 5, 1716) was an Italian painter of the late-Baroque period.

Biography
He was born in Perugia, and was a pupil of his uncle, Pietro Montanini. He painted a canvas for the sacristy of Santo Spirito of Perugia. He painted for a church in Corciano.

References

1662 births
1716 deaths
17th-century Italian painters
Italian male painters
18th-century Italian painters
Italian Baroque painters
Umbrian painters
18th-century Italian male artists